StarPlus is an Indian Hindi language general entertainment pay television channel owned by The Walt Disney Company India which is wholly owned by The Walt Disney Company. Its programming consists of  family dramas, comedies, youth-oriented reality shows, shows on crime and television films.

History
When it was first launched on 21 February 1992, StarPlus was an English language entertainment television channel, broadcasting international television shows from the United States, United Kingdom, Australia and New Zealand, with Zee TV being the Hindi-language counterpart.

After Star ended its relationship with Zee TV on 31 March 1996, StarPlus was transformed completely into a Hindi-language channel (from April 1996 to June 2000, StarPlus was a bilingual TV channel consisting of Hindi and English programmes), with Star World becoming the network's English-language counterpart channel. The company's CEO Sameer Nair and programming chief Tarun Katial introduced a number of new shows, which helped solidify the channel's position as a large influence in Hindi-language television broadcasting.

The channel launched in the United States in November 2004.

The channel's high-definition feed was launched on 15 April 2011. It carries the same schedule as the SD feed, but with different commercials. StarPlus HD was set to launch in both the United Kingdom and Ireland by the end of 2011, but it was delayed until 5 July 2012.

On 6 October 2017, Canada's ATN Channel lost rights to Star programming, with viewers directed to the new streaming service Hotstar, which was recently introduced into the Canadian market.

On 4 January 2019, Star similarly shut down its linear channels in the United States, in favour of Hotstar.

Rebranding
On 1 April 2001, the logo transformed yellow to blue and white, now cutting star.

On 14 June 2010, it underwent a rebranding along with a change from the blue rectangular logo to a ruby red star with the tagline "Rishta Wahi, Soch Nayi".

On 7 November 2016, it underwent a rebranding with the tagline "Nayi Soch".

On 27 May 2018, it underwent a rebranding with Alia Bhatt as the face of the campaign with the red crystal star with gold swoosh along with the tagline "Rishta Wahi, Baat Nayi" and signature song composed by A. R. Rahman.

On 30 December 2020, Disney announced that the Star branding in the Netherlands would be replaced with Utsav from 22 January 2021. On 22 January 2021, StarPlus became Utsav Plus in the UK and Europe.

Reception
In the early 2000s, StarPlus was at third position in terms of revenue and viewership after Zee TV and Sony Entertainment Television while none of the series were in top 10. With the launch of Indian Hindi version of Kaun Banega Crorepati, hosted by Amitabh Bachchan, the series became an instant hit becoming number one show followed by the launch of Kyunki Saas Bhi Kabhi Bahu Thi, on the same day which became second most watched after it which soon beat the latter to number one position while StarPlus soon became the most watched channel. This followed Kahaani Ghar Ghar Kii in October 2000 and later Kasautii Zindagi Kay a year after it and many more produced under Balaji Telefilms which made StarPlus to achieve the highest viewership during that time making the channel at No. 1 position since. Most of the series (80-90%) aired in the channel during that period were produced by Balaji Telefilms. 70% of the revenue for the production house was obtained from Star then.

After 2006, their top rated shows started to decline in viewership and were axed one by one by the channel. However, during 2008, differences arouse between Star India and Balaji due to termination of their serials over declining ratings, cancellation of joint venture for regional content in South India and as a result the agreement of Balaji buying Star's stake was terminated. Both suffered some downfall after it. However, after two years, they patched up and Tere Liye was the show produced after it in 2010. During the slight downfall in viewership in the end of the 2000s the no.1 position dominated by it for nine years continuously was beaten by the rival channel Colors TV in April 2009 for the first time pushing it to second position. During last week of May 2009, it was beaten by Zee TV for the first time in nine years, pushing it to third position and only Yeh Rishta Kya Kehlata Hai has maintained its ratings among Top 10.

In week 12 2020 while it dropped to fifth position in Hindi GEC while overall at sixth position in India, the following week the channel did not even feature in top ten Indian channels owing COVID-19 pandemic when production and new episodes broadcast were halted and reruns began. However, in week 15 it returned to the top ten.

Programming

From 2 October 2022, StarPlus extended its fiction airtime band to seven days a week. All shows aired everyday since then.

Programming blocks

Associated channels

Star Bharat 

Star Bharat (formerly Life Ok) is an Indian Hindi language general entertainment pay television channel owned by Disney Star which primarily telecasts dramas, crime and comedy shows.

Star Utsav 

Star Utsav is an Indian Hindi language general entertainment pay television channel owned by Disney Star which primarily telecasts reruns of popular shows from StarPlus & other sister channels.

Star Utsav Movies 

Star Utsav Movies is an Indian Hindi language movie pay television channel owned by Disney Star.

Star Gold 

Star Gold is an Indian Hindi language movie pay television channel owned by Disney Star which primarily telecasts Bollywood and Hollywood films.

Star Gold 2 

Star Gold 2 is an Indian Hindi language movie pay television channel owned by Disney Star which serves as a sister channel to Star Gold. While its SD feed was launched first as a replacement for Movies OK, it's HD feed has replaced UTV HD.

Star Gold Select 

Star Gold Select is an Indian Hindi language movie pay television channel owned by Disney Star which primarily telecasts critically acclaimed movies.

Star Gold Thrills 

Star Gold Thrills is an Indian Hindi language movie pay television channel owned by Disney Star which primarily telecasts American Hollywood action-based movies, dubbed in Hindi. It replaced UTV Action.

Star Gold Romance 

Star Gold Romance is an Indian Hindi language movie pay television channel owned by Disney Star which primarily telecasts romantic movies. It replaced UTV Movies.

References

External links

Television stations in Mumbai
Hindi-language television stations
Television channels and stations established in 1992
Hindi-language television channels in India
Disney Star
Indian companies established in 1992